Newcastle United F.C. Reserves and Academy are the reserve and academy teams for the Premier League club Newcastle United.

Under-21
The Under-21 team plays in the Premier League 2, Division 2. It also participates in the Northumberland Senior Cup each season. Newcastle Under-21 play their home games at Whitley Park, the former home ground of West Allotment Celtic, and also at the first team stadium St James' Park. In previous seasons the team has also played at Gateshead International Stadium, the home ground of Gateshead, and Kingston Park, the home ground of Newcastle Falcons.

Honours
League Winners
The Central League (1): 1947–48
Northern League (3): 1902–03, 1903–04, 1904–05
North Eastern League (6): 1906–07, 1907–08, 1908–09, 1910–11, 1922–23, 1925–26
Northern Football Alliance (5): 1897–98, 1900–01, 1901–02, 1938–39, 1957–58

Cups Winners
Northumberland Senior Cup (32): 1884–85 and 1888–89 (Newcastle East End), 1887–88 and 1891–92 (Newcastle West End), 1898–98, 1900–01, 1903–04, 1904–05, 1906–06, 1908–09, 1909–10, 1910–11, 1911–12 (joint), 1921–22, 1924–25, 1925–26, 1926–27, 1928–29, 1929–30, 1930–31, 1988–89, 1989–90, 1994–95, 1995–96, 1998–99, 1999–00, 2000–01, 2002–03, 2005–06, 2007–08, 2008–09, 2010–11, 2011–12, 2013–14, 2017-18
HKFC International Soccer Sevens (3): 2012, 2018, 2019

Under-18
The Under-18 team plays in the Premier League U18, North and is only for players 18 and below.

Home games are played at the academy base at Little Benton, located to the immediate south of Newcastle United's training ground, Darsley Park. FA Youth Cup home games are usually played at St James' Park.

As an ambitious club with aspirations of European football, the objective of Newcastle's academy is to develop players and their football-playing abilities to their fullest potential, so that these players might someday contribute to Newcastle's success on the pitch. This is made possible by guaranteeing the best training, education and management to the region's most promising players.

Honours
League Winners
Premier Academy League U17 (1): 2001–02

Cup Winners
FA Youth Cup (2): 1961–62, 1984–85
Milk Cup (2): 1985, 1989
Foca Tournament Cup (2): 2009, 2010
Brasileirão: 2010
Tournoi International de Football U17: 2015
Neuville Tournament: 2015

Players

Current players

The current Newcastle United Under-21 and Under-18 players are:

Notes

Notable Academy and Youth Team players

The following is a list of players who have played in the Newcastle United youth team and represented a country (not necessarily their country of birth) at full international level. Players who are currently playing at Newcastle United, or for another club on loan from Newcastle United, are highlighted in bold.

 Mehdi Abeid
 Curtis Good
 James Troisi
 Bjarni Guðjónsson
 David Edgar
 Tyler Pasher
 Peter Beardsley
 Bob Benson
 Jack Carr
 Andy Carroll
 Fraser Forster
 Paul Gascoigne
 Steve Howey
 Frank Hudspeth
 Eric Keen
 Alan Kennedy
 Jackie Milburn
 Jock Rutherford
 Charlie Spencer
 Steven Taylor
 Alan Thompson
 Tommy Thompson
 Colin Veitch
 Chris Waddle
 Charles N'Zogbia
 Jóan Edmundsson
 Tamás Kádár
 Alan O'Brien
 Mohammed Sangare
 Tim Krul
 Shola Ameobi
 Shane Ferguson
 Aaron Hughes
 Billy McCracken
 David Rayner
 Yven Moyo
 Andy Aitken
 Frank Brennan
 Gary Caldwell
 Steven Caldwell
 Brian Kerr
 Tom McInnes
 Rob McKinnon
 Peter McWilliam
 Bobby Moncur
 Sandy Higgins
 Tommy Pearson
 Haris Vučkić
 Matty Pattison
 Tony Whitson
 Andrew Parkinson
 Paul Dummett
 Alan Neilson

Awards

'Wor Jackie' Award
Awarded to the best young player of the year, named after legendary local player Jackie Milburn.
2019: Elias Sørensen
2018: Freddie Woodman
2017: Dan Barlaser
2016:  Michael Newberry
2015: Rolando Aarons
2014: Adam Armstrong
2013: Sammy Ameobi
2012: Remie Streete
2011: Jak Alnwick
2010: Bradden Inman
2009: Nile Ranger
2008: Kazenga LuaLua
2007: Andy Carroll
2006: Matty Pattison
2005: Paul Huntington
2004: Martin Brittain
2003: Peter Ramage
2002: Steven Taylor
2001: Shola Ameobi
2000: Gary Caldwell
1999: Michael Chopra
1998: Aaron Hughes

Jack Hixon Award
Named after Jack Hixon, a local scout who found several North-East youngsters who went on to become Professional Footballers.
2019: Liam Gibson
2018: Sean Longstaff
2017: Callum Roberts
2016: Owen Gallacher
2015: Freddie Woodman
2014: Mackenzie Heaney
2013: Adam Armstrong
2012: Alex Gilliead
2011: Adam Campbell
2010: Remie Streete

Manchester United Premier Cup's Most Valuable Player
2010: Adam Campbell

References

External links
 Under-21 squad on club website
 Under-18 squad on club website

Reserves
Football academies in England
Football clubs in Tyne and Wear
North Eastern League
Northern Football Alliance
Premier League International Cup